Torbjørn Schei, better known as Thebon (born 6 November 1982 in Steinkjer, Norway) is a Norwegian  musician, singer and songwriter.

Thebon has been noted for his work in several bands in his country, as Keep of Kalessin and Hellish Outcast.

Torbjørn is also a photographer and his own company can be found at www.scheimedia.net

Discography

With Keep of Kalessin 
 Armada - 2006
Kolossus - 2008	
The Dragontower (Single) - 2010	
Reptilian - 2010	
 The Divine Land (Single, 2011 edit)

With Khonsu 
 Anomalia - 2012

With Subliritum 
 Dark Prophecies - 2003

With Hellish Outcast 
Your God Will Bleed  - 2012
Stay of Execution  - 2015

External links 
Thebon at Metalleum Archives
Discogs.com
ScheiMedia Photography

1982 births
Black metal singers
Living people
Norwegian singer-songwriters
Musicians from Steinkjer
Norwegian heavy metal singers
Norwegian rock singers
Norwegian songwriters
Norwegian photographers
21st-century Norwegian singers
21st-century Norwegian male singers